{{Automatic taxobox
| taxon = Austrosiphonidae
| image = 
| image_caption = 
| authority = Cotton & Godfrey, 1938
| synonyms_ref = 
| synonyms = 
| type_genus= 
| type_genus_authority =
| subdivision_ranks = Genera
| subdivision = See text
}}

The Austrosiphonidae are a taxonomic family of large sea snails, often known as whelks.

Genera
 Antarctoneptunea Dell, 1972
 Kelletia P. Fischer, 1884
 Penion P. Fischer, 1884
  Serratifusus Darragh, 1969
Synonyms
 Austrosipho Cossmann, 1906: synonym of Penion P. Fischer, 1884
 Berylsma Iredale, 1924: synonym of Penion P. Fischer, 1884
 Largisipho Iredale, 1929: synonym of Penion P. Fischer, 1884
 Verconella Iredale, 1914: synonym of Penion'' P. Fischer, 1884 (unnecessary substitute name for Penion, by Iredale assumed to be a junior homonym of Penium Philippi, 1865.)

References

 Cotton, B. C. & Godfrey, F. K. (1938). A systematic list of the gastropoda the marine, freshwater and land univalve mollusca of south and central Australia. Adelaide: Malacological Society of South Australia. 44 pp.
  Kantor, Y.I., Fedosov, A.E., Kosyan, A.R., Puillandre, N., Sorokin, P.A., Kano, Y., Clark, R. & Bouchet, P. (2021). Molecular phylogeny and revised classification of the Buccinoidea (Neogastropoda). Zoological Journal of the Linnean Society. DOI: 10.1093/zoolinnean/zlab031: 1-69.

Buccinoidea